Maria Ştefan (later Mihoreanu, and Cosma, born 16 February 1954) is a retired Romanian sprint canoer who competed at the 1976, 1980 and 1984 Olympics. She won a gold medal in the K-4 500 m event in 1984 and placed fourth-fifth in the singles in 1976 and 1980. She won three bronze medals at the ICF Canoe Sprint World Championships, one each in the K-1 500 m (1983), the K-2 500 m (1981), and the K-4 500 m (1983) events. Her sister-in-law Maria Nichiforov is also a former Olympic canoer.

References

External links

1954 births
Living people
Canoeists at the 1976 Summer Olympics
Canoeists at the 1980 Summer Olympics
Canoeists at the 1984 Summer Olympics
Olympic canoeists of Romania
Olympic gold medalists for Romania
Romanian female canoeists
Olympic medalists in canoeing
ICF Canoe Sprint World Championships medalists in kayak

Medalists at the 1984 Summer Olympics